Karim Chishti (15 April 1936 – 13 May 2010) was an Indian cricketer. He played in twenty-five first-class matches for Uttar Pradesh from 1963/64 to 1974/75.

See also
 List of Uttar Pradesh cricketers

References

External links
 

1936 births
2010 deaths
Indian cricketers
Uttar Pradesh cricketers
Cricketers from Lahore
Cricketers from Lucknow